Brahmotri Mohanty (née Pattanayak) (1934 - 30 June 2010) was an Odia writer who writes in Odia. She has written numerous collections of poems. She is best known for her poetry collection  for which she won Odisha Sahitya Akademi Award in 1983.

Personal life
She was born at Puri in 1934. She is married to a Bijaykrushna Mohanty, an Odisha sahitya akademi award winner. She died aged 76.

Career
Her first poem was published in 1950. Her poems have been published in many Odia periodicals. Her first collection of poetry was published in 1972.

Published works

References

1934 births
2010 deaths
People from Puri
Indian women poets
Poets from Odisha
Odia-language poets
Odia-language writers
Women writers from Odisha
Recipients of the Odisha Sahitya Akademi Award
20th-century Indian women writers
20th-century Indian writers
20th-century Indian poets
21st-century Indian women writers
21st-century Indian writers
21st-century Indian poets